The men's 800 metres at the 2006 European Athletics Championships were held at the Ullevi on August 10, 11 and August 13.

Originally, the Latvian delegation, representing Dmitrijs Milkevics (4th), issued a complaint because Bram Som stepped out of the track twice. Som and Ellis both also complained that Milkevics had blocked their way and pushed them. However, after long considerations by the jury, the result stood.

Medalists

Schedule

Results

Round 1
Qualification: First 3 in each heat (Q) and the next 4 fastest (q) advance to the semifinals.

Semifinals
First 3 in each heat (Q) and the next 2 fastest (q) advance to the Final.

Final

External links
Results

800
800 metres at the European Athletics Championships